Paragona is a genus of moths of the family Erebidae. The genus was described by Staudinger in 1892.

Species
Paragona auroviridis Viette, 1958 Madagascar
Paragona cleorides Wileman, 1911 Japan
Paragona cognata (Staudinger, 1892) south-eastern Siberia, Korea, Japan
Paragona dubia Wileman, 1916 Taiwan
Paragona inchoata (Wileman, 1911) Japan
Paragona multisignata (Christoph, 1881) Korea, Amur
Paragona nemorata Kononenko, Han & Matov, 2010

References

Calpinae